"En el muelle de San Blas" (English: "On the pier of San Blas") is the fourth radio single and eighth track off of Maná's fifth studio album, Sueños Líquidos (1997). In the week of May 23, 1998, the song debuted and reached number eighteen on the U.S. Billboard Hot Latin Tracks. It stayed for a total of six weeks. The song was inspired by a woman in Nayarit, México, who waited for her fiancé to come back from a fishing trip; it was said he died in a storm, but his body was never found, so Rebeca Méndez Jiménez waited for him for 41 years (1971–2012). Méndez Jiménez died on 16 September 2012. The authorities of Nayarit are considering building a statue of her at the San Blas Port.

Charts

References

1998 singles
Maná songs
Spanish-language songs
Songs written by Fher Olvera
Songs written by Alex González (musician)
Warner Music Latina singles
1997 songs